The Eparchy of Zboriv was an eparchy of the Ukrainian Greek Catholic Church, in the ecclesiastical province of Lviv. It was established in 1993 and disestablished in 2000.

History 
 April 20, 1993: Established on territory split off from the Ukrainian Catholic Archeparchy of Lviv.
 July 21, 2000: Suppressed and divided between the Ukrainian Catholic Archeparchy of Ternopil – Zboriv and new created Ukrainian Catholic Eparchy of Sokal.

Eparchial bishops
The following is a list of the bishops of Zboriv and their terms of service:
(20 Apr 1993 – 13 Nov 1996) Mykhaylo Koltun, C.Ss.R.
(13 Nov 1996 – 07 Nov 1997) Mykhaylo Koltun, C.Ss.R., titular bishop of Casae in Pamphylia, Archiepiscopal Administrator
(07 Nov 1997 – 21 Jul 2000) Mykhaylo Koltun, C.Ss.R.

References

External links
GCatholic.org information on the eparchy
Profile at Catholic Hierarchy 

Zboriv
Christian organizations established in 1993
Religious organizations disestablished in 2000
Christian organizations disestablished in the 2000s